Stephen Yagman (born December 19, 1944) is an American federal civil rights lawyer, and general advocate. He has a reputation of being an advocate in cases regarding allegations of police brutality. He has argued hundreds of federal civil rights cases before a jury, and has been involved in over a hundred federal appeals.

Youth, education and early career
Stephen Yagman was born in 1944 in Brooklyn, New York to working-class parents. His father was a dental technician and his mother was a secretary. Yagman attended Abraham Lincoln High School. After attending the State University of New York at Buffalo, he then graduated from Long Island University in Brooklyn.

Yagman received a B.A. in American History, with co-majors in philosophy and political science. He later earned an M.A. in philosophy from New York University, where his mentor was Professor Sidney Hook, and his master's dissertation was on the Fifth Amendment's self-incrimination clause. He attended Fordham University School of Law, receiving a J.D. in 1974, where he was on the dean's list and received the Jurisprudence Award of the Guild of Catholic Lawyers. During graduate school and law school, he taught (English, remedial reading, social studies, economics, and Spanish) in the New York City public school system in Harlem and Bedford Stuyvesant, in Title I schools, from 1967-74. From 1967 until their divorce in 1994, he was married to Marion R. Yagman, with whom he practiced law for many years after their divorce.

Legal career
Yagman's legal career began before he graduated, as an attorney-intern with the New York City Legal Aid Society. Yagman was mentored by former N.Y. City Legal Aid Society director Martin Erdmann, attorney Charles Garry, house counsel to the Black Panther Party, and former U.S. Attorney General, Ramsey Clark. After graduating law school, he was appointed by New York State Attorney General Louis J. Lefkowitz to the office of the New York State Attorney General as a Special Assistant Attorney General, assigned as an Assistant Special Prosecutor for Nursing Homes, in the Manhattan office of the Special State Prosecutor for Nursing Homes.

In 1986, Yagman successfully challenged a proposed nationwide suspension of federal jury trials due to budget shortfalls, in Armster v. U.S. Dist. Ct., 792 F.2d 1423 (9th Cir. 1986). In a unanimous opinion in a related proceeding, Armster v. U.S. Dist. Ct, 817 F.2d 480 (9th Cir. 1987), Judge Stephen R. Reinhardt said, "Yagman's vigilance in the protection of his clients' constitutional rights served all citizens. His fortitude and tenacity in the service of his civil rights clients exemplifies the highest traditions of the bar." In January 2002, Yagman brought the first case seeking habeas corpus relief for Guantanamo Bay detainees, Coalition of Clergy, Lawyers & Professors v. George Walker Bush & Donald Rumsfeld, 310 F.3d 1153 (9th Cir. 2002). In December 2003, he won the first case in which it was declared that Guantanamo detainees were entitled to seek habeas corpus relief in United States courts.

On November 12, 1997, Yagman was sworn in by U.S. District Judge Robert M. Takasugi as Special Prosecutor for the State of Idaho to prosecute FBI sniper Lon T. Horiuchi in the August 22, 1992 Ruby Ridge killing of Vicki Weaver. In 2001, Yagman won a decision from the U.S. Court of Appeals for the Ninth Circuit declaring that federal law enforcement agents did not enjoy sovereign immunity and could be prosecuted criminally for state law homicide. Idaho v. Horiuchi, 253 F.3d 359 (9th Cir. 2001)(en banc). In January 2002, Yagman brought the first case seeking habeas corpus relief for Guantanamo Bay detainees, and in December 2003, won the first case in which it was declared that Guantanamo detainees were entitled to seek habeas corpus relief in United States courts. Gherebi v. Bush & Rumsfeld, 374 F.3d 727 (9th Cir. 2004).

In County of Los Angeles v. U.S. Dist. Ct. (Forsyth v. Block), 223 F.3d 990 (9th Cir. 2000), federal Ninth Circuit Chief Judge Alex Kozinski noted that Yagman: "has a formidable reputation as a plaintiff's advocate in police misconduct cases; defendants in such cases may find it advantageous to remove  him as an opponent." Some of his most notorious cases involved the Los Angeles Police Department and the Los Angeles County Sheriff's Department .

Yagman lodged complaints of judicial misconduct against U.S. District Judge Manuel Lawrence Real which, according to one commentator, "were at the center of the controversy over the effectiveness of the federal judicial disciplinary system and exerted a uniquely powerful influence on subsequent attempts at reform." The United States Judicial Conference cited the Yagman disciplinary case in adopting its 2008 nationwide procedures for handling complaints of misconduct against federal judges. In his 2011 book, Lawyers on Trial, UCLA School of Law Professor of Law Emeritus Richard L. Abel rated Yagman as a "highly competent, dedicated lawyer who is a champion of unpopular causes".

Criminal conviction
Yagman was convicted of one count of tax evasion, one count of bankruptcy fraud, and 17 counts of money laundering on August 23, 2007.  Yagman was convicted of "attempting to avoid payment of more than $100,000 in federal taxes", and he was sentenced to three years in federal prison.  Yagman also failed to pay "significant amounts of federal payroll taxes" by his then-law firm, Yagman & Yagman, P.C.  Although Yagman claimed he was singled out as retaliation, an appeals court upheld his conviction.  Yagman was summarily disbarred from the State Bar of California on December 22, 2010.

UCLA
In 2007, after Yagman's tax evasion conviction, he was invited to co-teach and taught a course at UCLA Law School on law, morality, and social justice with professor Frances Olsen.

Writings
Yagman has written two national legal practice books, Section 1983 Federal Jury Practice and Instructions (West Publishing, 1998), and Police Misconduct and Civil Rights, Federal Jury Practice and Instructions (Thomson Reuters West, 2002), a play, Guantanamo, Act IV (Beyond Baroque, 2004), and hundreds of newspaper columns.

Sources
 Los Angeles Reader, “L.A.P.D. Death Squad”, April 10, 1992, cover 
 Los Angeles New Times, “Cop Cruncher”, October 2, 1997, cover
 Los Angeles Times Magazine, “One Angry Man”, June 28, 1998, cover
 California LawBusiness, “Sympathy for the Devil”, November 6, 2000, cover
 Jerome Herbert Skolnick and James J. Fyfe, Above the Law, Police and the Excessive Use of Force (Free Press, 1993), pp. 17–18, 146-64, 203.

References

Long Island University alumni
Fordham University alumni
American civil rights lawyers
Disbarred American lawyers
Living people
1944 births
Activists from New York (state)
American people convicted of tax crimes
Abraham Lincoln High School (Brooklyn) alumni
Lawyers from Brooklyn